Mapudungun, the language of the Mapuche of modern south-central Chile and southwestern Argentina, did not have a writing system when the Spanish arrived. There have been a number of proposals for orthographies or Mapudungun alphabets, all of them using Latin script, but no consensus has yet been achieved between authorities, linguists and Mapuche communities on the one to be used.

The main systems (in order of proposal) are the following:

 Alfabeto Mapuche Unificado ("Unified Alphabet"), used by Chilean and Mapuche linguists and used in most of the scientific literature about the language.
 Grafemario Raguileo, made by Anselmo Raguileo Lincopil (1922–1992), who was a linguist of Mapuche origin. This orthography is supported by the indigenous Mapuche organization Consejo de Todas las Tierras.
 Nhewenh, an online proposal  by Heinrich Puschmann, based on the latin character set to facilitate international usage on the Internet.
 Azumchefi (also called Azümchefe), proposed by the Corporación Nacional de Desarrollo Indígena (CONADI) as a summary of about six earlier proposals, and recognized by the Chilean Ministry of Education, but not widely used.

A more thorough look at the sounds of Mapudungun is available here.

Consonants

Mapudungun has the following consonant system.

Also, Raguileo aims to use only one grapheme for each phoneme (no digraphs) so he uses some letters from the alphabet in an unexpected way.
(*) , which is spelled "tr" is also pronounced [].

Vowels

Mapudungun has six vowels. The three high vowels also have corresponding approximant consonants.

References

Bibliography

 

Latin alphabets
.Alphabet